Tschermigite is a mineral form of ammonium alum, formula NH4Al(SO4)2·12(H2O).  It is found in burning coal seams, bituminous shale and fumaroles.  Because of its extreme water solubility it is unlikely to persist except in the dryest of conditions.   Discovered in 1852 at Cermiky, also known as Tschermig in Bohemia. It is colorless and named for where it was discovered.

References

Ammonium minerals
Aluminium minerals
Sulfate minerals
Cubic minerals
Minerals in space group 205